Police nad Metují is a town in Náchod District in the Hradec Králové Region of the Czech Republic. It has about 4,000 inhabitants. The town centre is well preserved and is protected by law as an urban monument zone.

Administrative parts
The town part of Velká Ledhuje and villages of Hlavňov, Hony, Pěko and Radešov are administrative parts of Police nad Metují.

Geography
It lies in the Broumov Highlands, in the Broumovsko Protected Landscape Area. Despite its name, the nearby river Metuje flows outside the municipal territory.

History

Several hermits settled in the local forest at the beginning of the 13th century. The first written mentions of Police is in a charter dated 1213, by which King Ottokar I of Bohemia donated the area to the Břevnov Monastery in Prague, and in a document dated 1229, by which King Wenceslaus I confirmed the donation. Although these two documents are forgeries, they are not much older than the data mentioned in them. The first trustworthy written mention of Police is from 6 September 1253, when King Ottokar II of Bohemia endowed it with the right to hold markets.

In 1254–1294, the early Gothic Church of the Assumption of the Virgin Mary was built. The construction of the monastery began immediately afterwards and was finished in 1306. In 1395, Police was first referred to as a market town.

At the onset of the Hussite Wars, Police was sacked and burnt by the Catholic Silesians on 27 May 1421. In 1469, the army under command of Matthias Corvinus looted the market town and burned it down, including the monastery. During the early 16th century, Police recovered and prospered. However, the market town was almost completely destroyed by the great fire of 1535. It recovered again and in 1601, it was first referred to as a town.

During the Thirty Years' War, the town suffered and after the war significantly depopulated. It was also severely damages by fires in 1673 and 1700. During the first half of the 18th century, it recovered and new buildings were built. The monastery and the church were renovated in the Baroque style. The monastery was abolished by edict of Emperor Joseph II in 1786.

Police was growing in importance as a hub of business and culture in the first half of the 19th century. The promising development was slowed after the opening of the railway from Choceň to Meziměstí, which bypassed the town.

Demographics

Sights

The monastery is formed by originally early Gothic buildings from 1306 that were baroquely rebuilt in 1676–1772. Its premises now house the town museum. In the monastery complex is the Church of the Assumption of the Virgin Mary, partly baroquely rebuilt in 1716–1723. The chuch has an early Gothic angled portal with deep lining and rich plant decor with Romanesque elements from around 1270, which is a rare sculptural monument.

The historic town centre is made up of Masarykovo square and adjacent streets. The main landmark of the square is the town hall from 1718. The original tower burned down in 1842 and was replaced by new tower in the Tudor Revival style. The Pelly's houses in the square are three architecturally valuable houses, combined into one whole in 1931. Today they serve cultural and educational purposes.

Notable people
Hanuš Wihan (1855–1920), cellist
Miroslav Šmíd (1952–1993), rock climber and mountaineer

Twin towns – sister cities

Police nad Metují is twinned with:
 Colli al Metauro, Italy
 Świdnica, Poland
 Travnik, Bosnia and Herzegovina

References

External links

Official tourist portal

Cities and towns in the Czech Republic
Populated places in Náchod District